The Scout and Guide movement in the Central African Republic is served by
 Association Nationale des Guides de Centrafrique, member of the World Association of Girl Guides and Girl Scouts
 Fédération du scoutisme centrafricain, former member of the World Organization of the Scout Movement

See also